"" is the 38th single by Zard and released 23 June 2004 under B-Gram Records label. The single debuted at #4 rank first week. It charted for 6 weeks and sold over 46,000 copies.

Track list
All songs are written by Izumi Sakai

composer: Aika Ohno/arrangement: Satoru Kobayashi
Aika Ohno, Shiori Takei and Shinichiro Ohta were participating in chorus part
the song was used in [TBS] variety program Koisuru Hanikami as theme song

composer: Aika Ohno/arrangement: nightclubbers
 (What a beautiful moment Tour Opening Ver.)
composer: Akihito Tokunaga/arrangement: Daisuke Ikeda
an orchestral version of song Eien used in live tour as opening ceremonial
 (original karaoke)

Cover
The composer of Kakegae no Nai Mono, Aika Ohno self-cover this single in her cover album Silent Passage.

References

2004 singles
Zard songs
Songs written by Izumi Sakai
Songs written by Aika Ohno
2004 songs